USS Evarts (DE-5) was the lead ship of her class of destroyer escorts in the United States Navy.

Namesake
Milo Burnell Evarts was born on 3 September 1913 in Ruthton, Minnesota. He enlisted in the Naval Reserve on 31 August 1940, and was commissioned on 12 June 1941 as ensign. On the night of 11–12 October 1942, in the Battle of Cape Esperance, Lieutenant (junior grade) Evarts was killed in action when his ship  was damaged. Disregarding the danger of explosion from the fires which broke out in the gun turret of which he was in charge, Evarts stood to his station until killed. He was posthumously awarded the Navy Cross.

Construction and commissioning
Evarts was launched on 7 December 1942 at the Boston Navy Yard in Boston, Massachusetts, as BDE-5, intended for transfer to Britain. Instead, she was retained for use in the U.S. Navy, and commissioned on 15 April 1943.

Service history
After anti-submarine warfare training and experiments with radar in Chesapeake Bay, Evarts began steady service as a convoy escort, during much of which she flew the flag of Commander, Escort Division 5 (CortDiv 5). After five voyages to Casablanca, she sailed from Norfolk, Virginia, on 22 April 1944 on her first run to Bizerte. Two days before reaching that port, her convoy came under heavy attack by enemy torpedo bombers, and Evarts joined in the protective anti-aircraft barrage which shot down many of the attackers.

During the homeward bound passage of this same voyage, on 29 May, Evarts was detached from the convoy to aid the escort carrier  and destroyer escort , both of whom had been torpedoed by a German submarine. She arrived at the given position to find Block Island had sunk, but screened Barr, under tow, to safety at Casablanca. A second voyage to Bizerte was uneventful, as were the one to Palermo and the three to Oran which followed.

Completing her convoy escort duties on 11 June 1945, Evarts acted as target in exercises with submarines at New London, Connecticut, until arriving at New York on 11 September. There she was decommissioned on 2 October 1945, and was scrapped starting on 12 July 1946.

Awards

Evarts also received one battle star for her World War II service.

References

Evarts-class destroyer escorts
World War II frigates and destroyer escorts of the United States
Ships built in Boston
1942 ships